Charleville railway station is a station on the Cork to Dublin Railway line.

It is located a mile outside the town of Charleville mostly in North County Cork, Ireland though the border with County Limerick, Ireland crosses the track alignment diagonally, towards the northern end of the platforms. It is a small station, with three through platforms, though the third is rarely used.

Although a commuter service used to operate to Charleville for several years, the service ended in 2004 as a result of poor take-up.

In December 2005 services were further reduced to the station, in particular, the 21:00 services from Heuston to Cork no longer stop there.

The station opened on 19 March 1849 and was closed for goods traffic on 6 September 1976.

Until March 1967 Charleville was also the junction for the Cork Direct Line, the shorter route between Limerick and Cork which left the Limerick to Foynes line at Patrickswell.

References

External links
Irish Rail Charleville station website

Iarnród Éireann stations in County Cork
Railway stations in County Cork
Railway stations opened in 1849
1849 establishments in Ireland
Railway stations in the Republic of Ireland opened in 1849